Ursula, Margravine of Brandenburg (17 October 1488 – 18 September 1510) was a German noblewoman.

She was born in Berlin, the daughter of John Cicero, Elector of Brandenburg, and Margarethe of Saxony.

At age 19, on 16 February 1507 she married Duke Henry V of Mecklenburg-Schwerin (1479–1552).  They had three children:
 Sophia of Mecklenburg-Schwerin (1508–1541), married Ernest I, Duke of Brunswick-Lüneburg
 Magnus III of Mecklenburg-Schwerin (1509–1550) (predeceased his father)
 Ursula of Mecklenburg-Schwerin (30 August 1510 – 22 April 1586), abbess of Ribnitz

She died in Güstrow in 1510 at the age of 21, less than a month after the birth of her third child.

Ancestry

1488 births
1510 deaths
House of Hohenzollern
15th-century German women
15th-century German people
16th-century German women
16th-century German people
Daughters of monarchs